The 1968 season was the 63rd season of competitive football in Norway.

Men's football

League season

Promotion and relegation

1. divisjon

2. divisjon

Group A

Group B

3. divisjon

Norwegian Cup

Final

Northern Norwegian Cup

Final

UEFA competitions

European Cup

First round

|}

European Cup Winners' Cup

First round

|}

Second round

|}

Quarter-finals

|-
|align=right|Barcelona ||align=center|5–4||align=left| SFK Lyn||align=center|3–2||align=center|2–2 (in Barcelona) 
|}

Inter-Cities Fairs Cup

First round

|}

National team

References

www.rsssf.no

 
Seasons in Norwegian football